International Polar Bear Day is an annual event celebrated every February 27, to coincide with the time period when polar bear mothers and cubs are sleeping in their dens, and to raise awareness about the conservation status of the polar bear.

Description
International Polar Bear Day is organized by Polar Bears International to raise awareness about the impact of global warming and reduced sea ice on polar bear populations. The day encourages people to find ways to reduce their carbon output, such as by turning down their thermostat or driving less. The day has also been used to encourage the installation of energy efficient insulation in houses.

Observance

Many zoos use the day to educate about polar bear conservation and to encourage visits to polar bear exhibits. It has also had some political impact. Jack Shapiro, the deputy climate campaign manager under American president Barack Obama, used the day to argue for the need for Congressional action on the issue of climate change. The University of Saskatchewan announced in 2014 that it would be turning its thermostats up two degrees in the summer and down two degrees Celsius in the winter to honor International Polar Bear Day. The decision is expected to reduce the university's carbon emissions by two-thousand tons and save the university over two-hundred thousand dollars per year. International Polar Bear Day has been noted to be effective in raising awareness online about polar bears through information search.

References

Polar Bear
February observances
Polar bears in popular culture